The 1992 United States House of Representatives election in Wyoming were held on November 3, 1992 to determine who will represent the state of Wyoming in the United States House of Representatives. Wyoming has one, at large district in the House, apportioned according to the 1990 United States Census, due to its low population. Representatives are elected for two-year terms.

Major candidates

Democratic 
Jon Herschler

Republican 
Craig L. Thomas, incumbent U.S. congressman

Results

References 

1992 Wyoming elections
Wyoming
1992